Felipe Andrés Muñoz Flores (born 4 April 1985) is a Chilean football player as a defender.

Felipe Muñoz represented to the Chilean team in the 2005 FIFA U-20 World Cup celebrated in the Netherlands, Muñoz played all matches of the national team in the World Cup.

He achieved his first professional title in the Copa Chile 2009, after of defeat 2–1 to Deportes Ovalle.

External links
BDFA profile
Felipe Muñoz at Football Lineups

1986 births
Living people
Chilean footballers
Chile international footballers
Chilean Primera División players
Association football defenders
Universidad de Concepción footballers
Coquimbo Unido footballers
Colo-Colo footballers
Club Deportivo Palestino footballers